Mary Wiseman may refer to:
 Mary Wiseman (judge) (born 1961), American judge
 Mary Wiseman (actress) (born 1985), American acress